Galtsovka is a rural locality (a selo) in Baranovsky Selsoviet, Zmeinogorsky District, Altai Krai, Russia. The population was 335 as of 2013. There are 7 streets.

Geography 
Galtsovka is located 24 km southeast of Zmeinogorsk (the district's administrative centre) by road. Lazurka is the nearest rural locality.

References 

Rural localities in Zmeinogorsky District